Oxna is one of the Scalloway Islands, lying north west of Burra in Shetland, Scotland.

The island has been uninhabited since the First World War, but there is a house which is still used as a holiday home.

Papa island lies a few hundred metres to the east of Oxna's north coast.

References

Uninhabited islands of Shetland
Former populated places in Scotland
Scalloway Islands